Day Field is a 5,000-capacity stadium in Ashland, Virginia on the campus of Randolph-Macon College where it serves as home to the school's football program as well as both the men's and women's lacrosse teams..

The stadium is named for benefactor Frank L. Day who donated the land it sits on in 1937.

External links
 Day Field at RMC

College football venues
Sports venues in Virginia
Buildings and structures in Hanover County, Virginia
American football venues in Virginia